Stony Gorge Dam (National ID # CA10194) is a dam in Glenn County, California.

The concrete buttress dam was constructed between 1926 and 1928 by the United States Bureau of Reclamation, with a height of 153 feet and 868 feet long at its crest.  Structurally it is a relatively early example of an Ambursen-type dam, using contraction joints between all face slabs and buttresses for stability.

It impounds Stony Creek for irrigation storage and flood control.  Hydroelectric power is also produced.  Along with the East Park Dam about fifteen miles upstream, it is part of the Orland Project in the Sacramento valley, one of the Bureau of Reclamation's first generation of water projects.  The dam is owned by the Bureau and is operated by the local Orland Unit Water Users` Association.

The reservoir it creates, Stony Gorge Reservoir, has a water surface of 1,280 acres, a shoreline of about eighteen miles, and a maximum capacity of 58,500 acre-feet.  Recreation includes camping, boating, and fishing (for largemouth bass, smallmouth bass, bluegill, crappie, and catfish). The California Office of Environmental Health Hazard Assessment (OEHHA) has developed a safe eating advisory for fish caught in the Stony Gorge Dam based on levels of mercury or PCBs found in local species.

See also 

 List of dams and reservoirs in California
 List of lakes in California

References 

Dams in California
Reservoirs in Glenn County, California
United States Bureau of Reclamation dams
Dams completed in 1928
Energy infrastructure completed in 1928
Buildings and structures in Glenn County, California
Hydroelectric power plants in California
Dams in the Sacramento River basin
Reservoirs in California
1928 establishments in California
Reservoirs in Northern California